Present Joys is a studio album by trumpeter Dave Douglas and pianist Uri Caine which was released in July 2014 on the Greenleaf Music label. The album follows Douglas' 2012 exploration of hymns, Be Still, by including four songs from the Sacred Harp songbook.

Reception

The Allmusic review by Matt Collar awarded the album 3½ stars out of 5, stating "Ultimately, as the title implies, Present Joys showcases Douglas and Caine interacting in the moment with a thoughtful, creative joy". Writing for The Guardian, John Fordham called it "a 2014 jazz highlight".  PopMatters' Will Layman stated "Dave Douglas and Uri Caine are good enough to stand up to making “pretty” music, even traditional music. They pass the test and come out still surprising us".

Track listing
All compositions by Dave Douglas unless indicated
 "Soar Away" (Alfred Marcus Cagle) - 3:58   
 "Ham Fist" - 5:04   
 "Bethel" - 4:53   
 "Present Joys" (Cagle) - 4:57   
 "Supplication" (Floyd M. Frederick) - 3:02   
 "Seven Seas" - 4:29   
 "Confidence" (Oliver Holden) - 3:45   
 "End to End" - 3:02   
 "Old Putt" - 3:55   
 "Zero Hour" - 5:26

Personnel
Dave Douglas - trumpet
Uri Caine - piano

References

2014 albums
Dave Douglas (trumpeter) albums
Uri Caine albums
Greenleaf Music albums